The Indiana Governor's Cup (more commonly known as the Madison Regatta) is an H1 Unlimited hydroplane boat race held annually on Independence Day weekend on the Ohio River in Madison, Indiana. Madison has hosted the Madison Regatta annually since 1951, although the race was also contested in the 1930s. The race inspired a Hollywood motion picture released in 2005, titled Madison which starred actor Jim Caviezel.The Regatta was part of the APBA Gold Cup in 1979, 1980. 2019, & will be contested in 2021.

History

Informal racing took place in Madison, Indiana as early as 1911. But the first major race didn't occur until 1929. That was when the now-defunct Mississippi Valley Power Boat Association conducted a race for the 725 Cubic Inch Class, which evolved into the Unlimited Class after World War II. The MVPBA conducted the Webb Trophy at Madison in 1930. The Webb Trophy was the MVPBA equivalent of the APBA Gold Cup—their top award.

The 725s raced at Madison throughout the 1930s until the disastrous Ohio River flood of 1937 and World War II brought down the curtain for a while.

The current series of regattas in Madison began in 1949. This was a "wildcat" race, administered by the Ohio Valley Motor Boat Racing Association of Cincinnati. The largest class present was the 225 Cubic Inch Class.

The first Unlimited race took place in 1950. The Unlimited races at Madison from 1950 to 1953 were one-heat multi-class free-for-all affairs. They didn't count for National High Points.

The first High Points Unlimited race at Madison occurred in 1954. This came about largely through the efforts of Madison Courier columnist Phil Cole. (A High Points Unlimited race must be scheduled for a minimum of two heats with at least four boats making a legal start.)

Madison had an uninterrupted string of High Points Unlimited races every year from 1954 through 2012. The 2013 races were canceled because of flooding on the Ohio that covered the pit area, although the land-based events associated with the regatta went on as scheduled.

Madison hosted the APBA Gold Cup in 1971, 1979-1980, 2019, and 2021. Madison hosted the U.I.M. World's Championship in 1972 and 2004.

The Madison committee is the longest continuously active Unlimited committee in the country. Madison Regatta, Inc. (formerly the Madison Boat Club) has hosted the Unlimiteds every year since 1950 (except in 2013 and 2015 because of river conditions). Seattle didn't start until 1951. Detroit has been on the circuit since 1946, but with four different committees.

List of Madison Regatta winners
Source: 

1 H1 Unlimited cancelled the 2015 race because of high water and debris on the Ohio River where six of the 11 boats withdrew.  A non-championship race was held instead with five boats.

References

External links
Madison Regatta
H1 Unlimited

Racing motorboats
H1 Unlimited
Hydroplanes
Tourist attractions in Jefferson County, Indiana
Sailing in Indiana
Recurring sporting events established in 1951
1951 establishments in Indiana
Ohio River
Motorboat racing